The 1949 Ceasefire Line can refer to:
 The ceasefire lines drawn between Israel and its four neighbors by the 1949 Armistice Agreements
 The ceasefire line drawn between India and Pakistan in Kashmir by the Karachi Agreement